4222 Nancita is a bright background asteroid and upcoming Mars-crosser on an eccentric orbit from the inner regions of the asteroid belt. It was discovered on 13 March 1988, by American astronomer Eleanor Helin at Palomar Observatory in California, United States. It was named after the discoverer's daughter-in-law, Nancy Coker Helin.

Orbit and classification 

Nancita is a non-family asteroid from the main belt's background population when applying the hierarchical clustering method to its proper orbital elements. It will become a Mars-crossing asteroid in June 2019. It orbits the Sun in the inner main-belt at a distance of 1.7–3.1 AU once every 3 years and 8 months (1,331 days). Its orbit has an eccentricity of 0.29 and an inclination of 4° with respect to the ecliptic.

Naming 

This minor planet was named in honor of Nancy Coker Helin, daughter-in-law of the discoverer, and wife to Bruce Helin, after whom the minor planet 2430 Bruce Helin had previously been named. Nancy is described by the discoverer as a talented singer, composer and teacher, who has brought music and joy to her family. The  was published by the Minor Planet Center on 2 December 1990.

Physical characteristics 

In the SMASS classification, Nancita is a common S-type asteroid.

Rotation and shape 

A rotational lightcurve of Nancita, obtained from photometric observations at the Australian Hunters Hill Observatory  and collaborating stations in 2006, gave a well-defined rotation period of 3.8732 hours with a high brightness amplitude of 0.97 in magnitude, indicating that the body has a non-spheroidal shape.

Diameter and albedo 

According to the surveys carried out by the Infrared Astronomical Satellite IRAS, the Japanese Akari satellite, and the NEOWISE mission of NASA's Wide-field Infrared Survey Explorer, Nancita measures between 8.5 and 9.7 kilometers in diameter and its surface has an albedo in the range of 0.21 to 0.27. The Collaborative Asteroid Lightcurve Link agrees with the results obtained by IRAS.

References

External links 
 Lightcurve Database Query (LCDB), at www.minorplanet.info
 Dictionary of Minor Planet Names, Google books
 Asteroids and comets rotation curves, CdR – Geneva Observatory, Raoul Behrend
 Discovery Circumstances: Numbered Minor Planets (1)-(5000) – Minor Planet Center
 
 

004222
Discoveries by Eleanor F. Helin
Named minor planets
004222
19880313